Providence Township is a township in Hardin County, Iowa, USA.

History
Providence Township was organized in 1856.

References

Townships in Hardin County, Iowa
Townships in Iowa
1856 establishments in Iowa